The discography of Australian guitarist, singer and songwriter Tommy Emmanuel consists of twenty-seven studio albums, six live albums, four compilation albums and twenty-one singles.

Albums

Studio albums
{| class="wikitable plainrowheaders" style="text-align:center;" border="1"
|+ List of studio albums, with selected chart positions and certifications
! scope="col" rowspan="2" style="width:14em;"| Title
! scope="col" rowspan="2" style="width:16em;"| Album details
! scope="col" colspan="2"| Peak chart positions
! scope="col" rowspan="2" style="width:12em;"| Certifications
|-
! scope="col" style="width:3em;font-size:90%;"| AUS
! scope="col" style="width:3em;font-size:90%;"| NZ
|-
! scope="row"| From Out of Nowhere
|
 Released: 1979
 Label: Trafalgar
 Formats: Vinyl
| — || —
|
|-
! scope="row"| Untitled  (with Philippe Gabbay) 
|
 Released: 1981
 Label: ABC Music
 Formats: Vinyl
| — || —
|
|-
! scope="row"| Up from Down Under
|
 Released: 1987
 Label: Artful Balance 
 Formats: Vinyl, CD, cassette
| 48 || — 
| * AUS: Platinum 
|-
! scope="row"| Dare to Be Different
|
 Released: July 1990
 Label: Mega
 Formats: CD, cassette
| 13 || 39 
| * AUS: Platinum 
|-
! scope="row"| Determination
|
 Released: October 1991
 Label: Mega
 Formats: CD, cassette
| 17 || —  
| * AUS: Platinum 
|-
! scope="row"| The Journey
|
 Released: September 1993
 Label: Columbia Records
 Formats: CD, cassette
| 5 || —  
| AUS: 2× Platinum 
|-
! scope="row"| Terra Firma  (with Phil Emmanuel) 
|
 Released: March 1995
 Label: Columbia Records
 Formats: CD, cassette
| 12 || —  
|
|-
! scope="row"| Classical Gas  (with Australian Philharmonic Orchestra) 
|
 Released: November 1995
 Label: Columbia Records
 Formats: CD, cassette
| 6 || —  
| AUS: Gold 
|-
! scope="row"| Can't Get Enough 
|
 Released: October 1996
 Label: Columbia Records
 Formats: CD, cassette
| 26 || —  
|
|-
! scope="row"| The Day Finger Pickers Took Over the World  (with Chet Atkins) 
|
 Released: March 1997
 Label: Columbia Records
 Formats: CD, cassette
| — || —  
|
|-
! scope="row"| Collaboration
|
 Released: October 1998
 Label: Sony Music Australia
 Formats: CD, cassette
| 51 || —  
|
|-
! scope="row"| Only
|
 Released: August 2000
 Label: Favored Nations
 Formats: CD, cassette
| 53 || —  
|
|-
! scope="row"| Endless Road
|
 Released: May 2004
 Label: Favored Nations
 Formats: CD, cassette
| — || —  
|
|-
! scope="row"| The Mystery
|
 Released: 19 June 2006
 Label: Favored Nations
 Formats: CD, cassette
| — || —  
|
|-
! scope="row"| Happy Hour (with Jim Nichols) 
|
 Released: October 2006
 Label: Original Works
 Formats: CD, cassette
| — || —  
|
|-
! scope="row"| Just Between Frets (with Frank Vignola) 
|
 Released: 3 November 2009
 Label: Solid Air Records 
 Formats: CD
| — || —  
|
|-
! scope="row"| Little by Little
|
 Released: November 2010
 Label: Sony Music Australia
 Formats: CD, Digital download
| — || —  
|
|-
! scope="row"| All I Want for Christmas
|
 Released: 28 October 2011
 Label: Favored Nations 
 Formats: CD, DD
| 92 || —  
|
|-
! scope="row"| The Colonel & The Governor (with Martin Taylor) 
|
 Released: February 2013
 Label: Mesa/Bluemoon Recordings 
 Formats: CD, DD
| — || —  
|
|-
! scope="row"| The Guitar Mastery of Tommy Emmanuel
|
 Released: 2014
 Label: Favored Nations 
 Formats: CD, DD
| — || —  
|
|-
! scope="row"| Dov'è andata la musica (with Dodi Battaglia) 
|
 Released: 7 April 2015
 Label: Più In Alto
 Formats: CD, DD
| — || —  
|
|-
! scope="row"| Just Passing Through (with Ian Cooper and Ian Date) 
|
 Released: 23 June 2015
 Label: CGP Sounds
 Formats: CD, DD
| — || —  
|
|-
! scope="row"| It's Never Too Late
|
 Released: 7 August 2015
 Label: Sony Music Australia
 Formats: CD, DD
| 31 || —  
|
|-
! scope="row"| Christmas Memories
|
 Released: 28 October 2016
 Label: Sony Music Australia
 Formats: CD, DD
| — || —  
|
|-
! scope="row"| Pickin (with David Grisman)
|
 Released: 3 November 2017
 Label: Acoustic Disc
 Formats: DD
| — || —  
|
|-
! scope="row"| Accomplice One
|
 Released: 19 January 2018
 Label: CGP Sounds / Sony Music Australia
 Formats: CD, DD
| — || —  
|
|-
! scope="row"| Heart Songs  (with John Knowles)
|
 Released: 11 January 2019
 Label: CGP Sounds / Cooking Vinyl Records
 Formats: CD, DD, Streaming
| — || —  
|
|-
| align="center" colspan="6" style="font-size: 90%"| "—" denotes releases that did not chart or were not released in that country.
|-
|}

Live albums

Notes°''' Australian Music DVD Chart.

Compilation albums

Box sets

Extended plays

Singles

Other singles 

Music videos

Video
 1993 Guitar Talk 1996 Up Close 2002 Live at Sheldon Concert Hall 2006 Live at Her Majesty's Theatre, Ballarat, Australia 2008 Center Stage 2008 Emmanuel Labor 2012 Certified Gems 2014 Fingerstyle Milestones 2017 Music Gone Public''

References

Discographies of Australian artists